For the Philippine radio and television network, see Mabuhay Broadcasting System

 is an AM radio station based in Osaka, Japan. It is wholly owned by Mainichi Broadcasting System, Inc.

It is a member station of Japan Radio Network (JRN) and National Radio Network (NRN).

History 
 See Mainichi Broadcasting System#History of MBS.

Availability
JOOR
Frequency: 1210 kHz → 1180 kHz → 1179 kHz; 90.6 MHz FM
Power
Osaka: 50 kW
Kyoto: 300 W
Broadcasting hours: from 4:30 on Mondays until 26:30 on Sundays (with daily starting at 4:00 from Tuesday until Sunday)
Time signal: 1046.502 Hz (C6, on the hour every hour)

See also 
 MBS TV

References 
 History of MBS Radio

External links 
 

Kansai region
Radio in Japan
Radio stations established in 1951
1951 establishments in Japan
Mainichi Broadcasting System